Isaiah "Ike" McKinnon (born June 21, 1943) is an American former police officer employd by the Detroit Police Department from 1965 to 1984, and its chief from 1993 to 1998. He was one of the first African American officers in the Detroit police force, was the deputy mayor of Detroit from 2013 to 201, and was also a professor at University of Detroit Mercy. In 1967, while an officer in the Detroit police, McKinnon was almost killed by racist fellow police officers in an incident that was later covered internationally.

Early life and education
McKinnon was born on June 21, 1943, in Montgomery, Alabama. His father, Cota, was a carpenter and played the position of catcher in Negro league baseball. His mother Lula was a housewife.

In 1957, then-14 year old McKinnon,  was beaten by police officers while on his way home from school. According to McKinnon, that incident inspired him to join the police to reform the system.

McKinnon served in the United States Air Force from 1961 to 1965. He attended basic training in Texas, and spent three years at   Minot Air Force Base in North Dakota. He then served overseas in the Philippines and Vietnam during his last year in the military.

McKinnon holds a doctorate in higher education administration from Michigan State University, a master's in criminal justice from Mercy College of Detroit and a bachelor's in history and law enforcement from the University of Detroit.

Career

Police force
McKinnon joined the Detroit police department in 1965 where he worked until 1984. He later rejoined the force as chief of police from 1993 to 1998. 

During his time in the police force, McKinnon frequently experienced racism from his fellow white police officers. McKinnon was also the "poster officer" for recruiting more minorities into the police with his picture being used on police recruiting posters. McKinnon led initiatives in the police force such as teaching officers basic Spanish to communicate better with Hispanic Americans and he also laid the groundwork for a gun buy-back program.

During the 1967 Detroit riot, racial tensions increased in Detroit, and one night his fellow white police officers tried to kill him. McKinnon was driving home after an 18-hour shift, when he was pulled over by fellow police officers. McKinnon identified himself as a police officer and was still wearing his police uniform. One officer held a gun to him and said "Tonight you’re going to die, nigger." The officer shot at him but missed. McKinnon fled in his car. Though he reported the incident, no action was taken.

McKinnon led the investigation into the 1994 Cobo Arena attack on Nancy Kerrigan.

Deputy mayor
Detroit mayor Mike Duggan appointed McKinnon as deputy mayor in 2013 at which time McKinnon helped with the mayor's faith-based initiatives. He supported the installation of the controversial Homeless Jesus statue in front of Detroit's Saints Peter and Paul Church.

Academia
McKinnon was an associate professor of Education at University of Detroit Mercy. He took a leave of absence for two years when he served as deputy mayor of Detroit. He retired prior to September 2020.

Security
McKinnon served as the security detail for Detroit mayor Jerome Cavanagh.

Personal life 
McKinnon, raised Baptist, converted to Catholicism after marrying his wife.

References

1943 births
Living people
Military personnel from Montgomery, Alabama
Michigan State University alumni
University of Detroit Mercy alumni
University of Detroit Mercy faculty
Deputy mayors
Detroit Police Department chiefs
20th-century African-American people
21st-century African-American people
United States Air Force personnel of the Vietnam War
United States Air Force airmen
African-American Catholics